The men's 400 metres hurdles event  at the Friendship Games was held on 17 and 18 August 1984 at the Grand Arena of the Central Lenin Stadium in Moscow, Soviet Union.

Medalists

Results

Heats

Extra
Out of competition performances

Final

See also
Athletics at the 1984 Summer Olympics – Men's 400 metres hurdles

References
 

Athletics at the Friendship Games
Friendship Games